Nyandomsky District is an administrative district (raion), one of the twenty-one in Arkhangelsk Oblast, Russia. As a municipal division, it is incorporated as Nyandomsky Municipal District. It is located in the southwest of the oblast and borders with Plesetsky District in the north and west, Shenkursky District in the east, Velsky District in the southeast, Konoshsky District in the south, and with Kargopolsky District in the southwest. Its administrative center is the town of Nyandoma. Population:  The population of Nyandoma accounts for 73.9% of the district's total population.

History
The area was populated by speakers of Uralic languages and then colonized by the Novgorod Republic. It was always a remote part of Kargopol lands with sparse population. In the course of the administrative reform carried out in 1708 by Peter the Great, the area was included into Ingermanland Governorate (known from 1710 as Saint Petersburg Governorate). In 1727, it was transferred to the newly established Novgorod Governorate. After a number of administrative reforms, Kargopolsky Uyezd became one of the four uyezds of the newly established Olonets Governorate. In 1894, the decision was taken on the railroad construction from Vologda to Arkhangelsk. It was decided that the railroad would take the shortest route, which means it bypasses Kargopol and traverses the current territory of Nyandomsky District. In 1896, Nyandoma was founded as a railway station.

On July 15, 1929, the uyezds were abolished, the governorates merged into Northern Krai, and Nyandomsky District was established among others. It became a part of Nyandoma Okrug, one of the five in Northern Krai. In 1930, the okrug was abolished, and the district was subordinated to the central administration of Northern Krai. For a short period in the 1930s, the district absorbed some of the areas of abolished Konoshsky District, but in 1935 Konoshsky District was reestablished, and the areas were ceded to it. In 1936, the krai itself was transformed into Northern Oblast. In 1937, Northern Oblast was split into Arkhangelsk Oblast and Vologda Oblast. Nyandomsky District remained in Arkhangelsk Oblast ever since.

Geography
A major part of the district belongs to the basin of the Onega River. The Mosha River, a right tributary of the Onega, has its source in Lake Bolshoye Moshenskoye in the southeast of the district and flows northwest dividing the district into two roughly equal parts. The areas in the west of the district are in the basin of the Voloshka River, also a right tributary of the Onega. Minor areas in the east of the district belong to the basins of the left tributaries of the Vaga River—the Vel, the Padenga, and the Led. An area in the north of the district belongs to the basin of the Mekhrenga River, a right tributary of the Yemtsa. There are many lakes in the district, the biggest one being Lake Nimengskoye, which belongs to the basin of the Voloshka River.

A major part of the district is covered by coniferous forests (taiga). There are many swamps in the area.

Divisions

Administrative divisions
As an administrative division, the district is divided into eight selsoviets and one town of district significance (Nyandoma). One locality which previously had urban-type settlement status (Shalakusha), was downgraded to a rural locality in 2005. The following selsoviets have been established (the administrative centers are given in parentheses):
Andreyevsky (Andreyevskaya);
Burachikhinsky (Burachikhinskaya);
Lepshinsky (Stupinskaya);
Limsky (Navolok);
Moshinsky (Makarovskaya);
Shalakushsky (Shalakusha);
Shozhemsky (Shestiozersky);
Voyezersky (Gridino).

Municipal divisions
As a municipal division, the district is divided into one urban settlement and two rural settlements (the administrative centers are given in parentheses):
Nyandomskoye Urban Settlement (Nyandoma);
Moshinskoye Rural Settlement (Makarovskaya);
Shalakushskoye Rural Settlement (Shalakusha).

Economy

Industry
The most important industry in the district is timber industry. Food industry is also present

Agriculture
Agriculture in the region is limited mostly to milk and meat production.

Transportation

Nyandoma is on the paved road connecting Dolmatovo, which is on one of the principal highways in Russia, M8 connecting Moscow and Arkhangelsk, with Kargopol. Another paved road, in the southern direction, connects Nyandoma with Konosha.

Nyandoma is located on the railway line between Moscow and Arkhangelsk (built in the south-north direction), and as a matter of fact was founded in 1896 as a railway station and was only granted town status in 1939.

Culture and recreation
The district contains thirty-one objects classified as cultural and historical heritage of local importance. Most of these are chapels and wooden rural houses built prior to 1917.

The only state museum in the district is the House of Nyan, in Nyandoma.

References

Notes

Sources

Districts of Arkhangelsk Oblast